The 2013 Hong Kong–Shanghai Inter Club Championship was held on 5 November and 8 November 2012. The first leg will be played at Shanghai Stadium, Shanghai, China PR, with the second leg taken place at Mong Kok Stadium, Mong Kok, Hong Kong.

Current defending champions of Hong Kong First Division League South China was selected to represent Hong Kong while Chinese Super League club Shanghai Tellace represents Shanghai.

Shanghai Dongya won 2–1 at home but was defeated by 0–1 in Hong Kong. Match ended in 2–2 after 90 minutes and extra time. Liu Stephen Garlock's penalty miss in the seventh round crowned Shanghai Dongya the champions of 2013 Hong Kong–Shanghai Inter Club Championship.

Squads

Shanghai Dongya

South China

Match details

1st leg

2nd leg

References

2013–14 in Hong Kong football
Hong Kong–Shanghai Inter Club Championship
2013 in Chinese football